In enzymology, a malate dehydrogenase (quinone), formerly malate dehydrogenase (acceptor) (EC 1.1.99.16), is an enzyme that catalyzes the chemical reaction

(S)-malate + a quinone  oxaloacetate + reduced quinone

Thus, the two substrates of this enzyme are (S)-malate and a quinone, whereas its two products are oxaloacetate and reduced quinone.

This enzyme belongs to the family of oxidoreductases, specifically those acting on the CH-OH group of donor with a quinone as acceptor. The systematic name of this enzyme class is (S)-malate:quinone oxidoreductase. Other names in common use include FAD-dependent malate-vitamin K reductase, malate-vitamin K reductase, and (S)-malate:(quinone) oxidoreductase. This enzyme participates in pyruvate metabolism. It employs one cofactor, FAD.

References

 
 
 

EC 1.1.5
Flavoproteins
Enzymes of unknown structure